The 2018 WNBA Finals was the best-of-five championship series for the 2018 season of the Women's National Basketball Association (WNBA). It featured the top-seeded Seattle Storm and the three-seeded Washington Mystics. The series began on September 7, 2018 and ended on September 12, 2018. After winning the first two games at home, the Storm went on the road and completed the 3–0 series sweep. It was the franchise's first title in eight years and third overall.

Road to the Finals

Standings

Playoffs

Summary
The Mystics' regular home of Capital One Arena was not available during the 2018 postseason due to renovations. The team had played its previous home playoff games at Charles Smith Center on the campus of George Washington University in Washington's Foggy Bottom neighborhood, but that venue would also be unavailable for the Finals due to scheduling issues. The team then moved its home Finals games to EagleBank Arena at George Mason University near Fairfax, Virginia.

Game 1

In Game 1 of the WNBA Finals, Jewell Loyd came up big, leading the Storm in points and rebounds.  Loyd scored 23 points on 9-of-12 shooting and regular season MVP Breanna Stewart added 20 points in a 13 point Storm win.  The Storm went on a 16–4 run during the second quarter and never looked back.  Seattle lead by as many as 27 in the third quarter.

Game 2

Game 2 of the finals was a back and forth affair.  In the first quarter, the Storm started quickly and held a 9 point lead.  However, the Mystics came on strong in the second quarter and took a 4 point lead into halftime.  The Storm cut the lead to 3 at the end of the third quarter and eventually prevailed in the final period.  Seattle was now one win short of its third WNBA title.  Since the WNBA Finals went to a best-of-five format in 2005, no team has gone down 0–2 and forced a game five.

Game 3

In Game 3, Seattle dominated the first half, particularly in the second quarter.  By halftime, the Storm held a 17 point lead.  Washington showed life in the third quarter, pulling to within five points, but Seattle quickly responded with an 8–0 run to reclaim control.  From there, the Storm put the finishing touches on their third title as Finals MVP Breanna Stewart finished with a series-high 30 points while Sue Bird managed 10 assists.  Bird became the only player to have been a member of all three of the Storm's championship teams.

Team rosters

References

External links
WNBA Playoffs Home

Women's National Basketball Association Finals
Finals
WNBA Finals
Seattle Storm
Washington Mystics
Basketball competitions in Seattle
Basketball competitions in Washington, D.C.